The 1987 Houston Oilers season was the franchise's 18th season in the National Football League and the 28th overall. The Oilers came into the season looking to improve on their 5–11 record from 1986, and make the playoffs for the first time since 1980. The 1987 NFL season was affected by a players strike that took place in week 3 of the season, which canceled all week 3 games. As a result, the Oilers canceled their was-to-be week 3 game against the Los Angeles Raiders. The Oilers began the season 3–1, their best start to a season since 1980. After the Oilers lost at home to the Patriots 21–7 in week 5, the Oilers defeated the Atlanta Falcons and Cincinnati Bengals to give them a 5–2 start to the season. After the Oilers lost to the 49ers on the road, they beat the Pittsburgh Steelers on the road, 23–3, for their first win in Pittsburgh since 1978. The Oilers would then play 2 disastrous games against the Browns and the Colts, as they allowed 40+ points in each game, losing 40–7 to Cleveland at home and losing 51–27 to the Colts in Indianapolis. The Oilers would defeat the Chargers the next week, rebounding from those 2 bad losses. The Oilers would clinch a playoff spot in the season's final week with a 21–17 win over Cincinnati, thus ending their 6-year playoff drought. This was the first of seven consecutive playoff appearances for the Oilers. In the playoffs, they defeated the Seattle Seahawks 23–20 in overtime on a Tony Zendejas field goal. However, the next week, they lost to the Broncos 34–10 in the Divisional Round, ending their season.

Offseason

NFL draft

Personnel

Staff

Roster

NFL replacement players
After the league decided to use replacement players during the NFLPA strike, the following team was assembled:

Regular season

Schedule

Note: Intra-division opponents are in bold text.

Game summaries

Week 7

Standings

Playoffs

AFC Wild Card

Oilers kicker Tony Zendejas won the game with a 42-yard field goal 8:05 into overtime. Although Houston outgained Seattle with 427 total offensive yards to 250, the game remained close until the very end.

AFC Divisional Playoff

Awards and records
Keith Bostic, NFL Leader, Interceptions, (6) – Tied with two others for league lead

References

External links
 1987 Houston Oilers at Pro-Football-Reference.com

Houston Oilers
Houston Oilers seasons
Houston